In linguistics, lexical similarity is a measure of the degree to which the word sets of two given languages are similar. A lexical similarity of 1 (or 100%) would mean a total overlap between vocabularies, whereas 0 means there are no common words.

There are different ways to define the lexical similarity and the results vary accordingly. For example, Ethnologue'''s method of calculation consists in comparing a regionally standardized wordlist (comparable to the Swadesh list) and counting those forms that show similarity in both form and meaning. Using such a method, English was evaluated to have a lexical similarity of 60% with German and 27% with French.

Lexical similarity can be used to evaluate the degree of genetic relationship between two languages. Percentages higher than 85% usually indicate that the two languages being compared are likely to be related dialects.

The lexical similarity is only one indication of the mutual intelligibility of the two languages, since the latter also depends on the degree of phonetical, morphological, and syntactical similarity. The variations due to differing wordlists weigh on this. For example, lexical similarity between French and English is considerable in lexical fields relating to culture, whereas their similarity is smaller as far as basic (function) words are concerned.  Unlike mutual intelligibility, lexical similarity can only be symmetrical.

Indo-European languages

The table below shows some lexical similarity values for pairs of selected Romance, Germanic, and Slavic languages, as collected and published by Ethnologue.Notes:Language codes are from standard ISO 639-3.
Roberto Bolognesi and Wilbert Heeringa found the average divergence between Sardinian and Italian to be around 48.7%, ranging from a minimum dialectal degree of divergence being 46.6% to the highest one of 51.1%. That would make the various dialects of Sardinian slightly more divergent from Italian than Spanish (with an average degree of divergence from Italian being around 46.0%) is.
"-" denotes that comparison data are not available.
In the case of English-French lexical similarity, at least two other studies estimate the number of English words directly inherited from French at 28.3% and 41% respectively, with respectively 28.24% and 15% of other English words derived from Latin, putting English-French lexical similarity at around 0.56, with reciprocally lower English-German lexical similarities. Another study estimates the number of English words with an Italic origin at 51%, consistent with the two previous analyses.

See also

Lexis (linguistics)
Language family
Dialect
Linguistic distance

References
Ethnologue.com (lexical similarity values available at some of the individual language entries)
Definition of lexical similarity at Ethnologue.com
Rensch, Calvin R. 1992. "Calculating lexical similarity." In Eugene H. Casad (ed.), Windows on bilingualism '', 13-15. (Summer Institute of Linguistics and the University of Texas at Arlington Publications in Linguistics, 110). Dallas: Summer Institute of Linguistics and the University of Texas at Arlington.

Notes

External links
 Most similar languages
 A Similarity Database of Modern Lexicons: Lexical similarity of 331 languages

Language comparison